Bishop Verot High School is a private, Roman Catholic high school in Fort Myers, Florida.  It is located in the Diocese of Venice, Florida.

History
Bishop Verot Catholic High School was established in 1962 as Fort Myers Central Catholic High School.  The school was renamed Bishop Verot when they moved to their newly constructed location in 1964.  The school is named after Bishop Augustin Verot, the first Bishop of Florida. Suzie O'Grady is currently serving as the principal.

Athletics
The school's sports teams are nicknamed the "Vikings." The outdoor teams play on field turf installed in 2005. The indoor teams play in the John J. Nevins Gymnasium, which played host to the City of Palms Classic from 1994 to 2015.

Bishop Verot has claimed six state championships in its 50-year history: 1984 (volleyball), 1994 (baseball), 2001 (boys' soccer), 2010 (boys' soccer), 2011 (baseball) and most recently, 2016 (softball).

Notable alumni
 Dane Eagle, District 77, Florida House of Representatives 
 Chris Johnson, third baseman (Houston Astros, Arizona Diamondbacks, Atlanta Braves) 
 Adam Piatt, outfielder (Oakland Athletics, Tampa Bay Rays)
 Dan Vogelbach, first baseman (Chicago Cubs, Seattle Mariners, Toronto Blue Jays, Milwaukee Brewers, Pittsburgh Pirates, New York Mets)
 Seth Petruzelli, competed on The Ultimate Fighter 2, retired professional Mixed Martial Artist

Notes and references

Catholic secondary schools in Florida
Roman Catholic Diocese of Venice in Florida
Educational institutions established in 1962
High schools in Lee County, Florida
Education in Fort Myers, Florida
Buildings and structures in Fort Myers, Florida
1962 establishments in Florida